The 4th district of the Iowa House of Representatives is a legislative district in Iowa.

Past representatives
The district has previously been represented by:
 Walter W. P. Kruse, 1971–1973
 Rollin Edelen, 1973–1975
 Donald W. Spencer, 1975–1979
 Lee Warren Holt, 1979–1983
 Wayne D. Bennett, 1983–1993
 Ralph Klemme, 1993–2003
 Dwayne Alons, 2003–2014
 John Kooiker, 2015–2017
 Skyler Wheeler, 2017–present

References

004